Angir is a rural locality (an ulus) in Zaigrayevsky District, Republic of Buryatia, Russia. The population was 158 as of 2010. There is 1 street.

Geography 
Angir is located 61 km north of Zaigrayevo (the district's administrative centre) by road. Krasny Yar is the nearest rural locality.

References 

Rural localities in Zaigrayevsky District